The 1922 LSU Tigers football team represented Louisiana State University (LSU) as a member of the Southern Conference (SoCon) during the 1922 college football season. Led by Irving Pray, who returned for his third and final season as head coach after having helmed the team for part of the 1916 season and the entire 1919 season, the Tigers compiled an overall record of 3–7 with a mark of 1–2 in conference play, placing in a five-way tie for 11th in the SoCon.

Schedule

References

LSU
LSU Tigers football seasons
LSU Tigers football